The Great Seal of the State of North Dakota is the official seal of the U.S. state of North Dakota. The coloring added to the seal varies by source.

Description
The seal is based on the description of the seal of the Territory of Dakota, enacted in 1862-3:

The current description is found in Article XI, Section 2 of the Constitution of North Dakota.

The current seal was designed by Lili Stewart of North Dakota in 1987.

See also
Symbols of the State of North Dakota
Coat of arms of North Dakota
Flag of North Dakota

References

External links
The Great Seal of the State of North Dakota

Symbols of North Dakota
North Dakota
North Dakota
North Dakota
North Dakota
North Dakota
North Dakota
North Dakota
North Dakota